Americus may refer to:

Places in the United States
 Americus, Georgia, a city with a population of around 17,000
 Americus, Indiana, a small town in Washington Township
 Americus, Kansas, a city with a population of around 900
 Americus, Missouri, an unincorporated community
 Americus Township, Lyon County, Kansas

People
 Americus Backers (died 1778), described as the father of the English grand pianoforte style
 Americus Vespucius Rice (1835–1904), American politician, banker, and businessman
 Amerigo Vespucci (1454–1512) Italian merchant, explorer and cartographer whose first name was Americus in Latin
 Saint Emeric of Hungary (died 1031), also known as Saint Americus or Emeric, a Hungarian prince
 Americus Symmes (1811–1896), son of John Cleves Symmes Jr.

Other uses
 Americus (baseball team), a minor league club that represented the city of Americus, Georgia
 Americus Hotel, historic building in Allentown, Pennsylvania 
 Americus, Preston and Lumpkin Railroad, historic railroad that operated in the states of Georgia and Alabama
 Americus (horse) (died 1910), an American Thoroughbred racehorse
 Americus, a 2011 graphic novel by M. K. Reed, published by First Second Books